The Sixaxis (trademarked SIXAXIS) is a wireless gamepad produced by Sony for their PlayStation 3 video game console. It was introduced alongside the PlayStation 3 in 2006 and remained the console's official controller until 2008. The Sixaxis was succeeded by the DualShock 3, an updated version of the controller that, like the DualShock and DualShock 2 controllers, incorporates haptic technology – also known as force feedback. A Sixaxis controller can also be used with PSP Go via Bluetooth after registering the controller on a PlayStation 3 console.

The DualShock 3 was originally intended to be bundled with the PlayStation 3 in time for the console's launch. However, Sony was in the midst of appealing a decision from a 2004 lawsuit involving patent infringement claimed by Immersion. The two companies were at odds over the haptic feedback technology used in earlier PlayStation controllers. The legal battle led to a decision to remove the vibration capabilities from the PS3 controller's initial design, which became known as Sixaxis.

The term "sixaxis" is also used to refer to the motion-sensing technology in PlayStation 3 controllers. It is a contraction of "six axis", which refers to the ability to sense motion in all axes of the six degrees of freedom. The name is a misnomer because there are only three axes: X, Y, and Z, which allows six degrees of freedom (rotation about each axis and translation along each axis). It is also a palindrome.

History

At E3 2005, Sony showcased their "boomerang" design for the PlayStation 3's controller. Accompanied by much criticism, most of which were for its looks, this design was later abandoned. Sony later stated that the original controller "was very clearly designed as a design concept, and was never intended to be the final controller, despite what everybody said about it".

At E3 2006, Sony announced that the boomerang design had been replaced by the Sixaxis; a wireless, motion sensitive controller, similar in overall design to the earlier PlayStation DualShock controllers. The controller was bundled with all new systems from launch, until the introduction of the 80 GB (CECHKxx, CECHLxx & CECHMxx) model, which substituted the Sixaxis with the new DualShock 3 which added a vibration feature while retaining the design, features and functionality of the Sixaxis. The Sixaxis controller was later phased out and replaced by the DualShock 3 controller completely and is no longer being produced in any region. The Sixaxis survived longest in Europe, where the Metal Gear Solid 4: Guns of the Patriots PlayStation 3 bundle, released in summer of 2008, included a Sixaxis.

In 2011, Sony announced that their new handheld, the PlayStation Vita, would have Sixaxis motion-sensing capabilities.

Features and design
A major feature of the Sixaxis controller, and from where its name is derived, is the ability to sense both rotational orientation and translational acceleration along all three-dimensional axes, providing six degrees of freedom. This became a matter of controversy, as the circumstances of the announcement, made less than eight months after Nintendo revealed motion-sensing capabilities in its new game console controller (see Wii Remote), led to speculation that the addition of motion-sensing was a late-stage decision by Sony to follow Nintendo's move. Further fueling the speculation was the fact that Warhawk was the only game shown at E3 that year which demonstrated the motion-sensing feature.   Also, some comments from Incognito Entertainment, the developer behind Warhawk, said that it received development controllers with the motion-sensing feature only 10 days or so before E3. Developer Brian Upton from Santa Monica Studio later clarified that Incognito had been secretly working on the motion-sensing technology "for a while", but was also withheld a working controller until "the last few weeks before E3".

The Sixaxis features finer analog sensitivity than the DualShock 2, increased to 10-bit precision from the 8-bit precision of the DualShock 2. The controller also uses both analog and digital signals simultaneously at all times during gameplay. The frame beneath the L2 and R2 buttons has been omitted and these buttons have been made trigger-like, with the range of travel determining the degree of analog input rather than the range of pressure. In the place of the "Analog" mode button of previous Sony dual analog controllers (Dual Analog, DualShock and DualShock 2) is a jewel-like "PS button" with the PlayStation logo, which can be used to access the home menu or XMB (after system software version 2.40), switch controller inputs and turn the console or the controller on or off. It fulfills a similar function to the "Guide" button featured on Microsoft's Xbox 360 controller, or the "Home" button on the Wii Remote.

Lack of vibration capability
Sony announced that because of the included motion sensors, the vibration feature of previous PlayStation controllers was removed, stating that the vibration would interfere with motion-sensing. This therefore made the PS3 wireless controller feel light to players accustomed to heavier controllers such as the DualShock. Haptics developer Immersion Corporation, which had successfully sued Sony for patent infringement, expressed skepticism of Sony's rationale, with company president Victor Viegas stating in an interview, "I don't believe it's a very difficult problem to solve, and Immersion has experts that would be happy to solve that problem for them", under the condition that Sony withdraw its appeal of the patent infringement ruling.  The Wii Remote, another contemporary motion controller, was able to incorporate vibration.  Immersion later emphasized compatibility with motion-sensing when introducing its next-generation vibration feedback technology, TouchSense. Subsequent statements from Sony were dismissive of the arguments from Immersion, with SCEA Senior VP of Marketing Peter Dille stating, "It seems like the folks at Immersion are looking to sort of negotiate through the press and try to make their case to us … we've talked about how there's a potential for that rumble to interfere with the Sixaxis controller."

However, in a press release made some eight months later, Phil Harrison, Sony's president of worldwide studios, said he didn't see a need for Sony's controllers to have rumble noting that rumble was the "last generation feature" and that he thought "motion sensitivity is [the next-generation feature]." He added that rumble and other forms of feedback would continue to be valuable for certain types of games, but that it would likely come from third-party controllers. Sony later decided to include rumble functionality in their DualShock 3 controller.

Wireless technology
In a change from previous PlayStation controllers, the Sixaxis features wireless connectivity based on the Bluetooth standard.  However, the Sixaxis lacks a Bluetooth "discovery mode", which is normally used for connecting to Bluetooth devices wirelessly, so a wired USB connection is required to set up the Sixaxis with the appropriate Bluetooth address before a wireless connection can be made.  When used with the PSP Go, a PS3 is required to set up the Sixaxis.

PlayStation 3 controllers are compatible with Bluetooth-equipped Apple Macintosh computers, with no external software required. Workarounds have been created allowing the Sixaxis and DualShock 3 controllers to be used on PCs and Android devices despite this limitation, using custom software and Bluetooth drivers or in the case of Android, an app and root access.

Power
The Sixaxis wireless controller features an internal 3.7 V Li-ion battery, which provides up to 30 hours of continuous gaming on a full charge. Third party replacement batteries are also available. The battery was originally not thought to be replaceable when a Sony spokesperson stated that the Sixaxis should operate for "many years before there's any degradation in terms of battery performance. When and if this happens, then of course Sony will be providing a service to exchange these items". Later, it was revealed that the Sixaxis came with instructions on how to remove the battery and that the battery was fully removable. The DualShock 3 also uses this battery.

The Sixaxis can also draw power over a USB cable via a USB mini-B connector on the top of the controller. This allows the controller to be used when the battery is low and is also used for charging the battery. When connected via USB, the controller will communicate with the console over the USB connection, rather than wirelessly. This also applies to the DualShock 3.

LEDs

On the top of the controller is a row of four numbered LEDs, which are used to identify and distinguish multiple wireless controllers. These are similar to the indicators found on the Wii remote and the ring of light Xbox 360 Controller. Since the PlayStation 3 supports up to 7 controllers, but the controller only features 4 LEDs, controllers 5, 6 and 7 are represented as the sum of two other indicators (for example controller 5 is represented by illuminating indicators '4' and '1' at the same time, since 4+1=5). Sony also patented a technology to be able to track the motion of these LEDs with the PlayStation Eye camera for use alongside the PlayStation Move Controller. Though this was never utilised with the DualShock 3, its successor, the DualShock 4, features a light bar used for motion tracking, as well as player identification.

See also

DualShock
DualShock 3
Microsoft SideWinder Freestyle Pro
PlayStation 3
PlayStation 3 accessories
PlayStation Move
Xbox 360 controller
Wii Remote

References

External links

 Sixaxis Controller

PlayStation 3 accessories
Game controllers
Pointing devices
Haptic technology

es:Sixaxis
ja:DUALSHOCK#SIXAXIS